

Current listings

|}

Former listings

|}

Key

References 

 
Lane County